Richard Dien Winfield (born April 7, 1950) is an American philosopher and Distinguished Research Professor of Philosophy at the University of Georgia. He has been president of the Society for Systematic Philosophy, the Hegel Society of America, and the Metaphysical Society of America. Winfield was a candidate for U.S. Representative from Georgia's 10th congressional district in 2018 and for U.S. Senate during the 2020–21 United States Senate special election in Georgia.

Career 
Winfield graduated from Yale University in 1977. His doctoral thesis was The Social Determination of Production: The Critique of Hegel's System of Needs and Marx' Concept of Capital; his advisers were Louis Dupré and Andrzej Rapaczynski. In 1982 Winfield won the Roe Foundation Hegel Prize for his essay "Hegel's Challenge To The Modern Economy". In 1990 he was elected to the executive council of The American Hegel Society. He was the Member of Boards of Consultants of The Owl of Minerva from 1990 to 1996, and is a founding editorial board member of the journal Social Concept. In 2001 he received the title of Distinguished Research Professor from the University of Georgia.

Personal life 
Winfield has been married to Sujata Gupta Winfield since 1983 and they have three children. As of 2020, they live in Athens, Georgia. In 2019, Winfield founded the nonprofit organization "Alliance for a Social Bill of Rights", which advocates social rights such as a federal job guarantee, Medicare for all, and legal care for all.

Published books

 Democracy Unchained: How We Should Fulfill Our Social Rights and Save Self-Government (2020)
 Universal Biology after Aristotle, Kant, and Hegel: the Philosopher's Guide to Life in the Universe (2018)
 Conceiving Nature after Aristotle, Kant, and Hegel: the Philosopher's Guide to the Universe (2017)
 Rethinking Capital (2016)
 The Intelligent Mind: On the Origin and Constitution of Discursive Thought (2015)
Hegel and the Future of Systematic Philosophy (2014)
  Hegel's Phenomenology of Spirit: A Critical Rethinking in Seventeen Lectures (2013)
 Hegel's Science of Logic: A Critical Rethinking in Thirty Lectures (2012)
 The Living Mind: From Psyche to Consciousness (2011)
Hegel and Mind: Rethinking Philosophical Psychology (2010)
 Modernity, Religion, and the War on Terror (2007)
 From Concept to Objectivity: Thinking Through Hegel's Subjective Logic (2006)
 The Just State: Rethinking Self-Government (2005)
Autonomy and Normativity: Investigations of Truth, Right and Beauty (2001)
 The Just Family (1998)
Stylistics: Rethinking the Artforms after Hegel (1996)
 Systematic Aesthetics (1995)
 Law in Civil Society (1995)
Freedom and Modernity (1991)
Overcoming Foundations: Studies in Systematic Philosophy (1989)
Reason and Justice (1989)
 The Just Economy (1988)

References

External links
 Campaign website

20th-century American philosophers
Philosophy academics
1950 births
Presidents of the Metaphysical Society of America
Living people
Georgia (U.S. state) Democrats
Yale University alumni
University of Paris alumni
People from Queens, New York
University of Georgia faculty
Candidates in the 2020 United States Senate elections